Director musices, Latin for music director, was a title held by music directors especially at European universities or cathedrals; sometimes also at cathedral schools. The title is still used at universities in Sweden. In Finland it is an honorary award granted by the President of the Republic. 

Today directores musices are primarily responsible for music activities at a university and choral and/or orchestra conductors.

Swedish universities with director musices positions
 Uppsala University, since 1620
 Lund University, since 1748
 Linköping University, since 1993
 Umeå University, since 2000
 Royal Institute of Technology, since 2002
 Örebro University, since 2003
 Linnaeus University, since 2010

Directores musices
 Johann Sebastian Bach, "Cantor zu St. Thomae et Director Musices Lipsiensis"
 Johann Christian Friedrich Hæffner, Uppsala University 1808–1833
 Wilhelm Stenhammar, Uppsala University 1909
 Hugo Alfvén, Uppsala University 1910–1939
 Lars-Erik Larsson, Uppsala University 1961–1965

See also
Kapellmeister
Director of Music

Notes

Education and training occupations
Occupations in music